Michael Masucci is a test pilot for Virgin Galactic and a commercial astronaut. He is a former U.S. Air Force lieutenant colonel and U2 test pilot. Masucci first flew to space in February 2019, during the VSS Unity VF-01 mission, and again in July 2021, onboard Virgin Galactic Unity 22. He is scheduled to fly to space again onboard Unity 23, sometime in 2023.

Missions
 VSS Unity VF-01
 Virgin Galactic Unity 22
 Virgin Galactic Unity 23

References

Commercial astronauts
People who have flown in suborbital spaceflight
Virgin Galactic
Living people
Year of birth missing (living people)
Place of birth missing (living people)
American test pilots